Qinggir is a populated place in the Xinjiang Uyghur Autonomous Region of China. It is located on the border of Toksun County and Yuli County, northwest of the former Lake Lop Nur.

The Qinggir region in Lop Nur is used for vertical shaft nuclear weapons  testing.

Footnotes

External links
French and Chinese Nuclear Weapons Testing

Populated places in Xinjiang